Facundo Espinosa (born 28 April 1980) is an Argentine actor and musician.  He is probably best known for his performances in television series Campeones de la vida, Son amores, Los Roldán and Son de Fierro.

Filmography

Composer

Film scores 
Sudor frío (2010)
Familia para armar (2011)
Chacú (2011)

Television scores 
Femenino Masculino (2003) – Main Title Theme
Sangre fria (2004) – Main Title Theme
Showmatch (2008) – Main Title Theme
Dromo (2009)
Botineras (2009) – Main Title Theme 
Bienvenido Brian (2013)

Discography 
2008 – Loco suelto

Awards

References

External links 
 
 

1980 births
Living people
People from Buenos Aires
Argentine male child actors
Argentine male film actors
Argentine male television actors
Argentine songwriters
Male songwriters
Argentine film score composers
Argentine television composers
Male film score composers
Male television composers